Costillares, also known as Pinar de Chamartín, is a neighborhood part of the Ciudad Lineal district, in north Madrid, Spain.

Neighborhood
The neighborhood has 22,616 residents. It is named for a pinar (a small forest of pine trees) near the larger district of Chamartín. The current-day neighborhood, however, is located within the district of Ciudad Lineal.

Station

The station is the terminus for Line 1, Line 4 and the Metro Ligero line 1. As the 1 is one of the most important lines in all of Madrid, the 4 serves the local area of Hortaleza, and the ML1 serves the nearby Cercanías station in the new and expanding neighborhood of Sanchinarro, this station sees a high amount of traffic for being in a relatively low-population neighborhood far removed from the city center.

The station appears in the movie Doctor Zhivago and the neighborhood appears in the Spanish-language movie La cabina.

References 

Ciudad Lineal
Wards of Madrid